The Man and the Challenge is an American adventure fiction television series about a scientist who tests problems of human survival. It stars George Nader and aired on NBC during the 1959–1960 television season.

Synopsis
Dr. Glenn Barton is an athlete, explorer, adventurer, and former United States Marine who has become a physician and a research scientist for the Institute of Human Factors, a United States Government agency that designs and conducts experiments to study human endurance and its limits. His wide-ranging curiosity and interests suit him well for his assignments, which involve him testing equipment and personnel under conditions of extreme stress in a variety of research areas. He frequently subjects himself to the tests before allowing others to participate. Emergencies often arise which force Barton or his test subjects to go past the limits of previous tests in an attempt to save the situation. Lynn Allen is his assistant.

Cast
 George Nader...Dr. Glenn Barton
 Joyce Meadows...Lynn Allen

Production
The Man and the Challenge was an Ivan Tors-Ziv Television Programs production, and Ivan Tors produced the series. Each episode tells its story in a semi-documentary format.

Broadcast history
The Man and the Challenge premiered on September 12, 1959, and 36 episodes were produced. It aired on NBC on Saturdays at 8:30 p.m. Eastern Time against ABC's Leave it to Beaver and CBS's Wanted: Dead or Alive. The show was cancelled after a single season, and its last new episode was broadcast on June 11, 1960. Prime-time reruns of The Man and the Challenge then aired in its regular time slot until September 3, 1960.

Episodes
SOURCE

References

External links
  
 The Man and the Challenge Episode 19 "The Windowless Room" on YouTube
 The Man and the Challenge Episode 30 "The Dropper" on YouTube

American adventure television series
1959 American television series debuts
1960 American television series endings
1950s American television series
1960s American television series
Black-and-white American television shows
NBC original programming
Television shows set in the United States
English-language television shows
Works about scientists